Clybourn is a railroad station in Chicago serving Metra's Union Pacific North Line and Union Pacific Northwest Line. It is located at 2001 North Ashland Avenue (at West Armitage Avenue) and is the first station north of Ogilvie Transportation Center. Clybourn is located at Clybourn Junction. The Union Pacific North Line's Kenosha Subdivision begins here, separating from the Union Pacific Northwest Line's Harvard Subdivision. Clybourn Junction was named for its location near Clybourn Place, the home of the Clybourn family, early settlers in the Chicago area. Clybourn is situated between the Bucktown and DePaul neighborhoods, several miles north of downtown Chicago. In Metra's zone-based fare schedule, Clybourn is in zone A. As of 2018, Clybourn is the 17th busiest of Metra's 236 non-downtown stations, with an average of 1,674 weekday boardings.

North Line and Northwest Line trains stop on separate platforms, between which is a small parking lot. From west to east, the platforms are numbered from 1 to 4.  Platform 1 is an island platform, serving Northwest Line trains on the center track in the peak direction, and all outbound trains. Platform 2 is a side platform, serving inbound Northwest Line trains that do not run on the center track. Platforms 3 and 4, which serve the North Line, are side platforms. Platform 3 serves all outbound trains and Platform 4 serves all inbound trains. The busy Kennedy Expressway passes to the west of the Northwest Line tracks, and the north branch of the Chicago River is several blocks to the east. There is no ticket agent booth at the station; passengers must buy tickets on the train either online or after boarding.

The station is in a mostly industrial neighborhood, though it is served by Chicago Transit Authority buses.

The vast majority of trains that pass through the station make a scheduled stop there. On the North Line, on weekdays, as of April 25, 2022, all 70 trains (35 in each direction) stop at Clybourn.

On the Northwest Line, on weekdays, as of April 25, 2022, 59 trains (29 inbound, 30 outbound) stop at Clybourn.

On Saturdays, 22 North Line trains (11 in each direction) stop at Clybourn, with 16 trains (eight in each direction) stopping on Sundays. During the summer concert season, the extra weekend train to  also stops here.

On Saturdays, 31 Northwest Line trains (16 inbound and 15 outbound) trains also stop. On Sundays, 19 trains (nine inbound and 10 outbound) stop at Clybourn.

From Clybourn station, it is possible to take a train as far north as Kenosha, Wisconsin and as far northwest as Harvard, Illinois.

CTA Bus Connections
  9 Ashland 
  X9 Ashland Express 
  73 Armitage

References

Former Chicago and North Western Railway stations
Metra stations in Chicago
Railway stations in the United States opened in 1900
Union Pacific North Line